Mount Emmons (or Emmons Peak) is a summit in Duchesne County, Utah, United States. It is located within the Ashley National Forest and the High Uintas Wilderness.

It was named for geologist Samuel Franklin Emmons (as was another peak in Colorado).

See also
 List of mountains in Utah
 Mount Emmons (Colorado)

References

External links
 

Mountains of Utah
Mountains of Duchesne County, Utah